Chris Collins (born June 8, 1984) is an American former professional ice hockey forward who played most notably in the American Hockey League (AHL) and abroad in Europe.

Playing career

Amateur
He began his junior hockey career with the Rochester Jr B Americans. He made his mark in his single season with the Des Moines Buccaneers of the United States Hockey League (USHL).  He gained 2001–02 USHL All-Rookie Team honors, while also gaining the Buccaneers' Most Outstanding Rookie honor. He also got the Landmark Award, given annually to the Buccaneer fans' favorite player.  While Playing for the Buccaneers Collins had 65 points—26 goals and 39 assists—in 60 regular-season games that season.  He also won the team's scoring title and finished as the USHL's top-scoring rookie.

As a freshman at Boston College in 2002–03 Collins played in all 39 games, registering 23 points - 11 goals and 12 assists—making him the team's top-scoring freshman. He also racked up 16 points - eight goals and eight assists - in Hockey East action; he had five multiple-point games, two game-winning goals and three power-play goals, finished the season at +9 and earned 2002–2003 Hockey East All-Rookie Team honors.  He scored his first collegiate goal in his first game at UMass.

As a sophomore at Boston College in 2003–04 Collins played in 41 games, including all 24 Hockey East contests. He racked up 19 points - nine goals and 10 assists; he recorded 14 points - seven goals and seven assists - in Hockey East action and finished the season +11 and had three multiple-point games.  He also tallied two power-play goals and two game-winning goals and scored two goals, including the game-winner, against UMass Lowell.

As a junior at Boston College in 2004–05, Collins played in all 40 games, including all 24 Hockey East contests. He recorded 17 points - nine goals and eight assists -; he recorded nine points - three goals and six assists - in league action and finished the season +7, totaled 146 shots on the season, ranking second on the team and second in the league (behind teammate Patrick Eaves) and had three multiple-point games, including one multiple-goal game in Hockey East action. He also tallied two game-winning goals, two shorthanded goals and one power-play goal and scored two goals against North Dakota in the NCAA Tournament's quarterfinal round in Worcester, Massachusetts.

As a senior at Boston College in 2005–06, Collins tallied 63 points - 34 goals and 29 assists; he led Hockey East in scoring, tied for most points in the nation with Minnesota's Ryan Potulny and was one of three finalists for the Hobey Baker Award.  Collins helped guide the Eagles to the Frozen Four - their sixth trip in the last nine years. He earned all-tournament team honors after notching a hat trick against North Dakota in the NCAA Tournament's semifinal-round victory in Milwaukee. Collins also captured NCAA East first-team All-America honors and Hockey East's Player of the Year award last winter.

Professional

Collins signed a two-year entry level deal with the Boston Bruins and their general manager Peter Chiarelli on July 12, 2006. In his two years within the Bruins organization, Collins played primarily with American Hockey League affiliate, the Providence Bruins.

Prior to the 2008–09 season, Collins signed in Europe with Finnish team Lukko Rauma of the SM-liiga on July 10, 2008. After posting 3 goals in 19 games with Lukko, Collins was released and moved to German DEL club, Augsburger Panther on November 11, 2008.

Completing his second year with Augsburger in the 2009–10 season, Collins signed as a free agent with Pittsburgh Penguins AHL affiliate, the Wilkes-Barre/Scranton Penguins, on July 28, 2010.

Collins returned to Germany the following season, signing a one-year contract with the Thomas Sabo Ice Tigers on June 27, 2011.

On December 10, 2012, Collins signed a Professional Tryout Agreement with the Springfield Falcons of the AHL on loan from the Las Vegas Wranglers of the ECHL. He later returned for a second stint with the Wilkes-Barre/Scranton Penguins to complete the  2012–13 season.

On August 28, 2013, Collins signed a one-year ECHL contract as a free agent with the Bakersfield Condors.

Personal
Chris is the son of Anne and Glenn Collins; he has 3 siblings, one of them is Greg Collins who currently plays for the Edinburgh Capitals of the Elite Ice Hockey League.  He graduated from Valley High School in West Des Moines, Iowa.

Career statistics

Awards and honors

References

External links

1984 births
Living people
American men's ice hockey left wingers
Augsburger Panther players
Bakersfield Condors (1998–2015) players
Boston College Eagles men's ice hockey players
Des Moines Buccaneers players
Ice hockey players from New York (state)
Las Vegas Wranglers players
Long Beach Ice Dogs (ECHL) players
Lukko players
Norfolk Admirals players
People from West Des Moines, Iowa
People from Fairport, New York
Providence Bruins players
Springfield Falcons players
Thomas Sabo Ice Tigers players
Wilkes-Barre/Scranton Penguins players
AHCA Division I men's ice hockey All-Americans